Ceratina sequoiae is a species of small carpenter bee in the family Apidae. It is found in North America.

References

Further reading

 

sequoiae
Articles created by Qbugbot
Insects described in 1936